In quantum mechanics, in particular quantum information, the Range criterion is a necessary condition that a state must satisfy in order to be separable. In other words, it is a separability criterion.

The result 

Consider a quantum mechanical system composed of n subsystems. The state space H of such a system is the tensor product of those of the subsystems, i.e. .

For simplicity we will assume throughout that all relevant state spaces are finite-dimensional.

The criterion reads as follows: If ρ is a separable mixed state acting on H, then the range of ρ is spanned by a set of product vectors.

Proof 

On the other hand, we can also show  lies in Ran(M), for all i. Assume without loss of generality i = 1. We can write
, where T is Hermitian and positive semidefinite. There are two possibilities:

1) spanKer(T). Clearly, in this case,  Ran(M).

2) Notice 1) is true if and only if Ker(T) span, where  denotes orthogonal complement. By Hermiticity of T, this is the same as Ran(T) span. So if 1) does not hold, the intersection Ran(T)  span is nonempty, i.e. there exists some complex number α such that . So 

Therefore  lies in Ran(M).

The range criterion is a special case of this fact.

A density matrix ρ acting on H is separable if and only if it can be written as 

 

where  is a (un-normalized) pure state on the j-th subsystem. This is also

 

But this is exactly the same form as M from above, with the vectorial product state  replacing . It then immediately follows that the range of ρ is the linear span of these product states. This proves the criterion.

References 

 P. Horodecki, "Separability Criterion and Inseparable Mixed States with Positive Partial Transposition", Physics Letters A 232, (1997).

Quantum information science